Zheleznodorozhny Okrug may refer to:
Zheleznodorozhny Urban Okrug, a former municipal formation which the former city of Zheleznodorozhny in Moscow Oblast, Russia was incorporated as
Zheleznodorozhny Okrug, Kursk, a city division of Kursk, Russia